Hadith of Aden-Abyan (Arabic: حديث عدن أبين) is a prophecy revealed by the Islamic prophet Muhammad predicting the appearance of an army from the Aden and Abyan regions in Yemen who will make Islam victorious over its opponents.

Prophecy
In the Hadith, the Prophet is reported to have said:

Interpretation
The Hadith refers to the apocalyptic events of the end of time which underlines the involvement of the people of southern Arabia and their goal to establish Islamic rule. Recently, a militant organization named Aden-Abyan Islamic Army was founded in Yemen, to establish an Islamic government in Arabia.

See also
 Islamic eschatology

References

External links
 Yemen and the Aden-Abyan Islamic Army

Hadith
Spread of Islam